The Design 1001 ship (full name Emergency Fleet Corporation Design 1001) was a wood-hulled cargo ship design approved for production by the United States Shipping Boards Emergency Fleet Corporation (EFT) in World War I. They were referred to as the "Ferris"-type after its designer, naval architect Theodore E. Ferris. Most ships were completed in 1918 or 1919. Many ships were completed as barges or as hulls.

Gallery

References

External links
 EFC Design 1001: Illustrations

Standard ship types of the United States